Reinhold Jean Matz (June 1, 1892 – December 21, 1969) was an American- born Canadian ice hockey player. Matz played senior amateur and professional ice hockey from 1911 until 1928, including one season in the National Hockey League for the Montreal Canadiens in 1924–25.

Playing career
Johnny Matz began playing senior-level hockey in 1911–12 with the Edmonton YMCA of the Alberta Senior Hockey League. He next played for the Edmonton Dominions of the Edmonton league in 1912–13, and then played two seasons of ice hockey with the Grand Forks Athletic Club of the Boundary Hockey League in British Columbia. Matz played his first professional game in 1914–15 with the Vancouver Millionaires of the Pacific Coast Hockey Association (PCHA). He played one further season with the Rossland Ramblers senior team, then enlisted for duty in World War I with the Royal North West Mounted Police and saw service in Great Britain.

Back from Europe in 1919–20 Matz played two seasons for the Edmonton Hustlers and the Edmonton Dominions of the Big-4 League in Alberta. He later joined the professional Edmonton Eskimos of the West Coast Hockey League in 1921, playing one and a half season for the Edmonton club, as well as one and a half season for the Saskatoon Crescents of the WCHL. In 1924–25, he played one season for the Montreal Canadiens of the National Hockey League (NHL) which won the NHL championship but lost in the Stanley Cup Final against the Victoria Cougars of the WCHL. He did not play in 1925–26 due to injury, but returned to Western Canada for two seasons with the Moose Jaw Maroons before retiring from ice hockey.

Career statistics

Regular season and playoffs

References

Notes

External links
 

1892 births
1969 deaths
American men's ice hockey centers
Canadian ice hockey centres
Edmonton Eskimos (ice hockey) players
Montreal Canadiens players
Saskatoon Sheiks players
Ice hockey people from Edmonton
Sportspeople from Nebraska
Vancouver Millionaires players
American emigrants to Canada